Coenosia mollicula is a species of fly in the family Muscidae. It is found in the  Palearctic .

References

Muscidae
Insects described in 1825
Brachyceran flies of Europe